Gerald Mortag (8 November 1958 – 30 January 2023) was an East German track cyclist. He had his best achievements in the 4000 m team pursuit. In this discipline he won a silver medal at the 1980 Summer Olympics, as well as three gold medals at the world championships in 1977–1979. He missed the 1984 Summer Olympics due to their boycott by East Germany and competed at the Friendship Games instead, winning a gold medal.

References

1958 births
2023 deaths
East German male cyclists
Olympic cyclists of East Germany
Cyclists at the 1980 Summer Olympics
Olympic medalists in cycling
Olympic silver medalists for East Germany
Sportspeople from Gera
Cyclists from Thuringia
Medalists at the 1980 Summer Olympics
People from Bezirk Gera